George Lisle Crowther (18 April 1892 – 1957) was an English professional football forward who played in the Football League for Hartlepools United, Tranmere Rovers, Bradford Park Avenue, West Ham United and Huddersfield Town.

Personal life 
Crowther served as a private in the 17th (Service) Battalion of the Middlesex Regiment during the First World War.

Career statistics

References

1892 births
Footballers from County Durham
English footballers
Association football inside forwards
English Football League players
Huddersfield Town A.F.C. players
Rotherham Town F.C. (1899) players
Association football forwards
Shildon A.F.C. players
1957 deaths
Halifax Town A.F.C. players
Ashton United F.C. players
Bradford (Park Avenue) A.F.C. players
West Ham United F.C. players
Hartlepool United F.C. players
Tranmere Rovers F.C. players
British Army personnel of World War I
Middlesex Regiment soldiers
Date of death unknown
People from Bishop Middleham